Colón Centro y Noroeste is a barrio (neighbourhood or district) of Montevideo, Uruguay.

Location
It borders Lezica / Melilla to the west and northwest, Colón Sudeste / Abayubá to the east and northeast, Peñarol / Lavalleja to the southeast, Conciliación and Sayago to the south.

Bibliography

See also 
Barrios of Montevideo

External links 
 Intendencia de Montevideo / Historia de Colón
 Revista Raices / Historia de Colón y Villa Colón

Barrios of Montevideo